James Wadsworth Booth (September 9, 1822 New York City – September 14, 1876 Nyack, New York) was an American politician from New York.

Life
He attended schools in New York City, and became a dyer and manufacturer of cotton goods.

He was a member of the Board of Fire Commissioners in 1865, but resigned after three months. In 1873, he was elected by the State Legislature as a Regent of the University of the State of New York.

He was a member of the New York State Senate (5th D.) from 1874 until his death, sitting in the 97th, 98th and 99th New York State Legislatures.

He died from heart disease at the house of his brother-in-law in Nyack, New York on September 14, 1876 at age 54.

References

Sources
 The Fire Commissioners Sworn In in NYT on May 4, 1865
 The Fire Department in NYT on  September 5, 1865
 NOMINATION OF REGENT OF THE UNIVERSITY in NYT on May 14, 1873

1822 births
1876 deaths
Republican Party New York (state) state senators
Regents of the University of the State of New York
Politicians from New York City
19th-century American politicians